The Second Cold War,  

Cold War II,

or the New Cold War

are terms that refer to heightened political, social, ideological, informational, and military tensions in the 21st century. The term is usually used in the context of the tensions between the United States and China. It is also used to describe similar tensions between the United States and Russia, the primary successor state of the former Soviet Union, one of the major parties of the original Cold War until its dissolution in 1991. The term is sometimes used to describe tensions in multilateral relations between two or more groups of nations. Some commentators have used the term as a comparison to the original Cold War, while others have discouraged the use of the term to refer to any current tensions.

Past usages 

Past sources,

 such as academics Fred Halliday, Alan M. Wald, and David S. Painter, used the interchangeable terms to refer to the 1979–1985 and/or 1985–1991 phases of the Cold War.  Some other sources used similar terms to refer to the Cold War of the mid-1970s. Columnist William Safire argued in a 1975 New York Times editorial that the Nixon administration's policy of détente with the Soviet Union had failed and that "Cold War II" was then underway.

Academic Gordon H. Chang in 2007 used the term "Cold War II" to refer to the Cold War period after the 1972 meeting in China between US President Richard Nixon and Chinese Communist Party chairman Mao Zedong.

In May 1998, George Kennan described the Republican-controlled US Senate vote to expand NATO to include Poland, Hungary, and the Czech Republic as "the beginning of a new cold war", and predicted that "the Russians will gradually react quite adversely and it will affect their policies".

The journalist Edward Lucas wrote in 2008 that a new cold war between Russia and the West had already begun.

Usage in a multilateral context 
In his op-ed for The Straits Times, Kor Kian Beng wrote that the phrase "new Cold War" between US-led allies versus Beijing and Moscow did not gain traction in China at first. This changed in 2016 after the United States announced its plan to deploy Terminal High Altitude Area Defence (THAAD) in South Korea against North Korea, but China and Russia found the advanced anti-missile system too close for comfort. The US also supported a tribunal ruling against China in favor of the Philippines in the South China Sea. Afterwards, the term "new Cold War" appeared in Chinese media more often. Analysts believe this does not reflect China's desire to pursue such a strategy but precautions should still be in place in order to lower the chances of any escalation.

In June 2019, University of Southern California (USC) professors Steven Lamy and Robert D. English agreed that the "new Cold War" would distract political parties from bigger issues such as globalization, global warming, global poverty, increasing inequality, and far-right populism. However, Lamy said that the new Cold War had not yet begun, while English said that it already had. English further said that China poses a far greater threat than Russia in cyberwarfare but not as much as far-right populism does from within liberal states like the US.

In his September 2021 speech to the United Nations General Assembly, US President Joe Biden said that the US is "not seeking a new Cold War or a world divided into rigid blocs." Biden further said that the US would cooperate "with any nation that steps up and pursues peaceful resolution to shared challenges," despite "intense disagreement in other areas, because we'll all suffer the consequences of our failure."

In early May 2022, Hoover Institution senior fellow Niall Ferguson said at the Milken Institute Global Conference that "Cold War II began some time ago". He also said "Cold War II is different, though, because in Cold War II, China's the senior partner, and Russia's the junior partner", and "in Cold War II, the first hot war breaks out in Europe, rather than Asia." Later in the same month, David Panuelo, President of the Federated States of Micronesia, used the term to state his opposition to a proposed cooperation agreement between China and ten island nations, by claiming it could create a "new 'cold war' between China and the west." 

A journalist Michael Hirsh in June 2022 used the term "[global] Cold War" to refer to tensions between leaders of NATO (North Atlantic Treaty Organization) and China and its ally Russia, both countries striving to challenge the US's role as a superpower. Hirsh further cited growing tensions between the US and China as one of the causes of the newer Cold War alongside NATO's speech about China's "systemic challenges to the rules-based international order and to areas relevant to alliance security". He further cited the Russian invasion of Ukraine in 2022 as one of factors of the newer Cold War's rise.

In July 2022, James Traub used the term while discussing how the ideas of the Non-Aligned Movement, a forum of neutral countries organized during the original Cold War, can be used to understand the reaction of democratic countries in the developing world to current tensions. In the same month France, the United States and Russia scheduled high-level, multi-country diplomatic visits in Africa. An article reporting on these trips used the term "new Cold War" in relation to what "some say is the most intense competition for influence [in Africa] since the [original] Cold War".

An article published in the July 2022 issue of the journal Intereconomics linked the possible "beginning of a new cold war between the
West and the East" with "the rebirth of a new era of conflict, the end of the late 20th century unipolar international security architecture under the hegemony of the United States, [and] the end of globalisation".

In August 2022, an analysis article in the Israeli newspaper Haaretz used the term to refer to the US's "open confrontation with Russia and China". The article continues on to discuss the impact of the current situation on Israel, concluding that "in the new Cold War, [Israel] cannot allow itself to be neutral." In the same month, Katrina vanden Heuvel used the term while cautioning against what she perceived as a "reflexive bipartisan embrace of a new Cold War" against Russia and China among US politicians.

In September 2022, a Greek civil engineer and politician Anna Diamantopoulou further stated, despite unity of NATO members, "the West has lost much of its normative power," citing her "meetings with politicians from Africa, Latin America, and the Middle East." She further stated that the West will risk losing "a new cold war" unless it overcomes challenges that would give Russia and China a greater world advantage. She further gave suggestions to the Western powers, including the European Union.

Usage in the context of China–United States tensions 

The US senior defence official Jed Babbin, Yale University professor David Gelernter,

Firstpost editor R. Jagannathan,

Subhash Kapila of the South Asia Analysis Group,

former Australian Prime Minister Kevin Rudd,

and some other sources

have used the term (occasionally using the term "Pacific Cold War") to refer to tensions between the United States and China in the 2000s and 2010s.

Trump presidency

Donald Trump, who was inaugurated as US president on 20 January 2017, had repeatedly said during his presidential campaign that he considered China a threat, a stance that heightened speculations of the possibility of a "new cold war with China".

Claremont McKenna College professor Minxin Pei said that Trump's election win and "ascent to the presidency" may increase chances of the possibility.

In March 2017, a self-declared socialist magazine Monthly Review said, "With the rise of the Trump administration, the new Cold War with Russia has been put on hold", and also said that the Trump administration has planned to shift from Russia to China as its main competitor.

In July 2018, Michael Collins, deputy assistant director of the CIA's East Asia mission center, told the Aspen Security Forum in Colorado he believed China under paramount leader and general secretary Xi Jinping, while unwilling to go to war, was waging a "quiet kind of cold war" against the United States, seeking to replace the US as the leading global power. He further elaborated: "What they're waging against us is fundamentally a cold war — a cold war not like we saw during [the] Cold War (between the U.S. and the Soviet Union) but a cold war by definition".

In October 2018, a Hong Kong's Lingnan University professor Zhang Baohui told The New York Times that a speech by United States Vice-president Mike Pence at the Hudson Institute "will look like the declaration of a new Cold War".

In January 2019, Robert D. Kaplan of the Center for a New American Security wrote that "it is nothing less than a new cold war: The constant, interminable Chinese computer hacks of American warships’ maintenance records, Pentagon personnel records, and so forth constitute war by other means. This situation will last decades and will only get worse".

In February 2019, Joshua Shifrinson, an associate professor from Boston University, criticised the concerns about tensions between China and the US as "overblown", saying that the relationship between the two countries are different from that of the US–Soviet Union relations during the original Cold War, that factors of heading to another era of bipolarity are uncertain, and that ideology play a less prominent role between China and the US.

In June 2019, academic Stephen Wertheim called President Trump a "xenophobe" and criticised Trump's foreign policy toward China for heightening risks of a new Cold War, which Wertheim wrote "could plunge the United States back into gruesome proxy wars around the world and risk a still deadlier war among the great powers."

In August 2019, Yuan Peng of the China Institute of International Studies said that the financial crisis of 2007–2008 "initiated a shift in the global order." Yuan predicted the possibility of the new cold war between both countries and their global power competition turning "from 'superpower vs. major power' to 'No. 1 vs. No. 2'." On the other hand, scholar Zhu Feng said that their "strategic competition" would not lead to the new Cold War. Zhu said that the US–China relations have progressed positively and remained "stable", despite disputes in the South China Sea and Taiwan Strait and US President Trump's aggressive approaches toward China.

In January 2020, columnist and historian Niall Ferguson opined that China is one of the major players of this Cold War, whose powers are "economic rather than military", and that Russia's role is "quite small".

Ferguson also wrote: "[C]ompared with the 1950s, the roles have been reversed. China is now the giant, Russia the mean little sidekick. China under Xi remains strikingly faithful to the doctrine of Marx and Lenin. Russia under Putin has reverted to Tsarism." Ferguson further wrote that this Cold War is different from the original Cold War because the US "is so intertwined with China" at the point where "decoupling" is as others argued "a delusion" and because "America's traditional allies are much less eager to align themselves with Washington and against Beijing." He further wrote that the new Cold War "shifted away from trade to technology" when both the US and China signed their Phase One trade deal. In a February 2020 interview with The Japan Times, Ferguson suggested that, to "contain China", the US "work intelligently with its Asian and European allies", as the US had done in the original Cold War, rather than on its own and perform something more effective than "tariffs, which are a very blunt instrument." He also said that the US under Trump has been "rather poor" at making foreign relations.

On May 24, 2020, China Foreign Minister Wang Yi said that relations with the US were on the "brink of a new Cold War" after it was fuelled by tensions over the COVID-19 pandemic.

In June 2020, Boston College political scientist Robert S. Ross wrote that the US and China "are destined to compete [but] not destined for violent conflict or a cold war." In July, Ross said that the Trump "administration would like to fully decouple from China. No trade, no cultural exchanges, no political exchanges, no cooperation on anything that resembles common interests."

In August 2020, a La Trobe University professor Nick Bisley wrote that the US–China rivalry "will be no Cold War" but rather will "be more complex, harder to manage, and last much longer." He further wrote that comparing the old Cold War to the ongoing rivalry "is a risky endeavour."

In September 2020, the UN Secretary General António Guterres warned that the increasing tensions between the US under Trump and China under Xi were leading to "a Great Fracture" which would become costly to the world. Xi Jinping replied by saying that "China has no intention to fight either a Cold War or a hot one with any country."

Biden presidency

In March 2021, Columbia University professor Thomas J. Christensen wrote that the cold war between the US and China "is unlikely" in comparison to the original Cold War, citing China's prominence in the "global production chain" and absence of the authoritarianism vs. liberal democracy dynamic. Christensen further advised those concerned about the tensions between the two nations to research China's role in the global economy and its "foreign policy toward international conflicts and civil wars" between liberal and authoritarian forces. He further noted newly elected US President Joe Biden's planned different approach from predecessor Donald Trump.

In September 2021, former Portuguese defence and foreign minister Paulo Portas described the announcement of the AUKUS security pact and the ensuing unprecedented diplomatic crisis between the signatories (Australia, the United Kingdom, and the United States) and France (which has several territories in the Indo-Pacific) as a possible formal starting point of a new Cold War.

On 7 November 2021, President Joe Biden's national security adviser Jake Sullivan stated that the US does not pursue system change in China anymore,

marking a clear break from the China policy pursued by previous US administrations. Sullivan said that the US is not seeking a new Cold War with China, but is looking for a system of peaceful coexistence.

In November 2021, Hal Brands and Yale professor John Lewis Gaddis wrote in their Foreign Affairs article that China and the US have been entering "a new cold war", meaning "a protracted international rivalry, for cold wars in this sense are as old as history itself." Brands and Gaddis further wrote that this has not been "the Cold War" and that "the context is quite different". Both authors differentiated the "Soviet–American Cold War" from the "Sino-American cold war".

According to a poll done by Morning Consult, only 15 percent of US respondents and 16 percent of Chinese respondents think the countries are in a cold war, with most rather categorizing it as a competition.

In August 2022, the Chinese Ministry of Foreign Affairs released a statement condemning US House speaker Nancy Pelosi's visit to Taiwan. This statement demanded, among other things, that the US "not seek a 'new Cold War'".

Following a November 2022 meeting between Biden and Xi Jinping at the G20 summit in Bali, Biden told reporters that "there need not be a new Cold War".

In December 8, 2022 statement to the press announcing the creation of the House Select Committee on Strategic Competition between the United States and the Chinese Communist Party, Kevin McCarthy, who weeks later was elected as the US House speaker, wrote that "China and the US are locked in a cold war."

Usage in the context of Russia–United States tensions

Debate over the term 

Sources disagree as to whether a period of global tension analogous to the Cold War is possible in the future,

while others have used the term to describe the ongoing renewed tensions, hostilities, and political rivalries that intensified dramatically in 2014 between Russia, the United States and their respective allies.

Stephen F. Cohen, Robert D. Crane, and Alex Vatanka have all referred to a "US–Russian Cold War". 

Sources opposed to the term argue that while new tensions between Russia and the West have similarities with those during the Cold War, there are also major differences,

and provide Russia with new avenues for exerting influence, such as in Belarus and Central Asia, which have not seen the type of direct military action in which Russia engaged in less cooperative former Soviet states like Ukraine and the Caucasus region. 

In June 2014, the Macedonian Ministry of Defense published an article asserting that the term "Cold War II" was as a misnomer.

In February 2016, at the Munich Security Conference, NATO Secretary General Jens Stoltenberg said that NATO and Russia were "not in a cold-war situation but also not in the partnership that we established at the end of the Cold War", while Russian Prime Minister Dmitry Medvedev, speaking of what he called NATO's "unfriendly and opaque" policy on Russia, said "One could go as far as to say that we have slid back to a new Cold War".

In October 2016 and March 2017, Stoltenberg said that NATO did not seek "a new Cold War" or "a new arms race" with Russia.

In February 2016, a Higher School of Economics university academic and Harvard University visiting scholar Yuval Weber wrote on E-International Relations that "the world is not entering Cold War II", asserting that the current tensions and ideologies of both sides are not similar to those of the original Cold War, that situations in Europe and the Middle East do not destabilise other areas geographically, and that Russia "is far more integrated with the outside world than the Soviet Union ever was".

In September 2016, when asked if he thought the world had entered a new cold war, Russian Foreign Minister, Sergey Lavrov, argued that current tensions were not comparable to the Cold War. He noted the lack of an ideological divide between the United States and Russia, saying that conflicts were no longer ideologically bipolar.

In August 2016, Daniel Larison of The American Conservative magazine wrote that tensions between Russia and the United States would not "constitute a 'new Cold War'" especially between democracy and authoritarianism, which Larison found more limited than and not as significant in 2010s as that of the Soviet-Union era. Andrew Kuchins, an American political scientist and Kremlinologist speaking in December 2016, believed the term was "unsuited to the present conflict" as it may be more dangerous than the Cold War.

In August 2017, Russian Deputy Foreign Minister Sergei Ryabkov denied claims that the US and Russia were having another cold war, despite ongoing tensions between the two countries and newer US sanctions against Russia. A University of East Anglia graduate student Oliver Steward and the Casimir Pulaski Foundation senior fellow Stanisław Koziej in 2017 attributed Zapad 2017 exercise, a military exercise by Russia, as part of the new Cold War. 

In March 2018, Russian President Vladimir Putin told journalist Megyn Kelly in an interview: "My point of view is that the individuals that have said that a new Cold War has started are not analysts. They do propaganda." Michael Kofman, a senior research scientist at the CNA Corporation and a fellow at the Wilson Center's Kennan Institute said that the new cold war for Russia "is about its survival as a power in the international order, and also about holding on to the remnants of the Russian empire". Lyle Goldstein, a research professor at the US Naval War College claims that the situations in Georgia and Ukraine "seemed to offer the requisite storyline for new Cold War". Also in March 2018, Harvard University professors Stephen Walt and then Odd Arne Westad

criticised application of the term to increasing tensions between Russia and the West as "misleading", "distract[ing]", and too simplistic to describe the more complicated contemporary international politics.

In October 2018, Russian military analyst Pavel Felgenhauer told Deutsche Welle that the new Cold War would make the Intermediate-Range Nuclear Forces (INF) Treaty and other Cold War-era treaties "irrelevant because they correspond to a totally different world situation." In February 2019, Russian Foreign Minister Sergey Lavrov stated that the withdrawal from the INF treaty would not lead to "a new Cold War".

Russian news agency TASS reported the Russian Foreign Minister Sergei Lavrov saying "I don't think that we should talk about a new Cold War", adding that the US development of low-yield nuclear warheads (the first of which entered production in January 2019)

had increased the potential for the use of nuclear weapons.

Middle East conflicts 

In 2013, Michael Klare compared in RealClearPolitics tensions between Russia and the West to the ongoing proxy conflict between Saudi Arabia and Iran. Oxford Professor Philip N. Howard argued that a new cold war was being fought via the media, information warfare, and cyberwar.

Some observers, including Syrian President Bashar al-Assad,

judged the Syrian civil war to be a proxy war between Russia and the United States,

and even a "proto-world war". In January 2016, senior UK government officials were reported to have registered their growing fears that "a new cold war" was now unfolding in Europe: "It really is a new Cold War out there. Right across the EU we are seeing alarming evidence of Russian efforts to unpick the fabric of European unity on a whole range of vital strategic issues".

In April 2018, relations deteriorated over a potential US-led military strike in Middle East after the Douma chemical attack in Syria, which was attributed to the Syrian Army by rebel forces in Douma, and poisoning of the Skripals in the UK.  The Secretary-General of the United Nations, António Guterres, told a meeting of the UN Security Council that "the Cold War was back with a vengeance".  He suggested the dangers were even greater, as the safeguards that existed to manage such a crisis "no longer seem to be present".

Dmitri Trenin supported Guterres' statement, but added that it began in 2014 and had been intensifying since, resulting in US-led strikes on the Syrian government on 13 April 2018.

In February 2022, journalist Marwan Bishara held the US and Russia responsible for pursuing "their own narrow interests", including then-US President Trump's recognition of Jerusalem as capital of Israel as well as Putin's 2022 Russian invasion of Ukraine, and for "pav[ing] the way for, well, another Cold War".

Russo-Ukrainian War 

The term "Cold War II" gained currency and relevance as tensions between Russia and the West escalated throughout the 2014 pro-Russian unrest in Ukraine followed by the Russian military intervention and especially the downing of Malaysia Airlines Flight 17 in July 2014. By August 2014, both sides had implemented economic, financial, and diplomatic sanctions upon each other: virtually all Western countries, led by the US and European Union, imposed punitive measures on Russia, which introduced retaliatory measures.

In 2014, notable figures such as Mikhail Gorbachev warned, against the backdrop of a confrontation between Russia and the West over the Russo-Ukrainian War, 

that the world was on the brink of a new cold war, or that it was already occurring. The American political scientist Robert Legvold also believes it started in 2013 during the Ukraine crisis. Others argued that the term did not accurately describe the nature of relations between Russia and the West.

In October 2016, John Sawers, a former MI6 chief, said he thought the world was entering an era that was possibly "more dangerous" than the Cold War, as "we do not have that focus on a strategic relationship between Moscow and Washington".

Similarly, Igor Zevelev, a fellow at the Wilson Center, said that "it's not a Cold War [but] a much more dangerous and unpredictable situation".

CNN opined: "It's not a new Cold War. It's not even a deep chill. It's an outright conflict".

In January 2017, former US government adviser Molly K. McKew said at Politico that the US would win a new cold war.

The New Republic editor Jeet Heer dismissed the possibility as "equally troubling[,] reckless threat inflation, wildly overstating the extent of Russian ambitions and power in support of a costly policy", and too centred on Russia while "ignoring the rise of powers like China and India". Heer also criticised McKew for suggesting the possibility.

Jeremy Shapiro, a senior fellow in the Brookings Institution, wrote in his blog post at RealClearPolitics, referring to the US–Russia relations: "A drift into a new Cold War has seemed the inevitable result".

Speaking to the press in Berlin on 8 November 2019, a day before the 30th anniversary of the fall of the Berlin Wall, US Secretary of State Mike Pompeo warned of the dangers posed by Russia and China and specifically accused Russia, "led by a former KGB officer once stationed in Dresden", of invading its neighbours and crushing dissent. Jonathan Marcus of the BBC opined that Pompeo's words "appeared to be declaring the outbreak of a second [Cold War]".

In February 2022, journalist H. D. S. Greenway cited the Russian invasion of Ukraine and 4 February joint statement between Russia and China (under Putin and Xi Jinping) as one of the signs that Cold War II had officially begun.

In March 2022, Yale historian Arne Westad and Harvard historian Fredrik Logevall in a videotelephony conversation asserted "that the global showdown over Ukraine" would "not signal a second Cold War". Furthermore, Westad said that Putin's words about Ukraine resembled, which Harvard journalist James F. Smith summarized, "some of the colonial racial arguments of imperial powers of the past, ideas from the late 19th and early 20th century rather than the Cold War."

In June 2022, journalist Gideon Rachman asserted the Russian invasion of Ukraine as the start of a second Cold War.

See also 

 Artificial Intelligence Cold War
 "Back to the Cold War" (South Park episode)
 Cold peace
 International relations since 1989
 Iran–Saudi Arabia proxy conflict
 Middle Eastern Cold War (disambiguation)
 Post–Cold War era
 Post-Soviet conflicts
 Russia–NATO relations
 World War III

References

Further reading 

 Economy, Elizabeth C. The World According to China (John Wiley & Sons, 2021).

 Khong, Yuen Foong. "The US, China, and the Cold War analogy." China International Strategy Review 1.2 (2019): 223–237.

 Monaghan, Andrew. A'New Cold War'?: Abusing History, Misunderstanding Russia . London: Chatham House, 2015. 
 Smith, Nicholas Ross. A New Cold War?: Assessing the Current US-Russia Relationship . Springer, 2019. 
 Woodward, Jude. The US Vs China: Asia's New Cold War? (Manchester University Press, 2017). 
 Xiying, Zuo. "Unbalanced deterrence: Coercive threat, reassurance and the US-China rivalry in Taiwan strait." Pacific Review 34.4 (2021): 547–576.

External links

 
 
 

21st-century conflicts
Foreign relations of the European Union
Foreign relations of China
China–Russia relations
China–United States relations
21st century in Europe
21st century in Russia
Foreign relations of Russia
Foreign relations of the United States
Geopolitical rivalry
Global conflicts
History of Russia (1991–present)
Russia–NATO relations
Russia–European Union relations
Russia–United States relations
2010s neologisms
Possible future wars
Post–Cold War era